Category 1 is the lowest classification on the Saffir–Simpson hurricane wind scale, and categorizes tropical cyclones with 1-minute maximum sustained winds between . Tropical cyclones that attain such winds and move over land while maintaining those winds are capable of causing minor to moderate damage to human lives and infrastructure. As of 2021, a total of 242 hurricanes have peaked at Category 1 strength within the Northeast Pacific tropical cyclone basin, which is denoted as the part of the Pacific Ocean north of the equator and east of the International Date Line. Collectively, Category 1 hurricanes have killed at least 912 people. This does not include storms that also attained Category 2, 3, 4, or 5 status on the scale.

A combination of many factors serve to influence the development of tropical cyclones in the Northeastern Pacific basin. During the winter and early spring months from December to April, a high-pressure area known as the North Pacific High and a low-pressure area known as the Aleutian Low are present over the Northeastern Pacific, producing strong upper-level winds which inhibit tropical cyclone formation. During the late spring, summer, and fall months from May to November, these effects are reduced or may even vanish altogether, while sea surface temperatures are warm enough to support the development, perhaps even rapid, of tropical cyclones. The El Niño–Southern Oscillation plays a major role in the strength of trade winds and the sea surface temperatures in the tropical Pacific. During El Niño events, trade winds are weaker and sea surface temperatures are warmer, allowing for the development of more cyclones as well as more intense hurricanes, while the effects of La Niña are the opposite.

Background

Should a Category 1 hurricane make landfall, its strongest winds can cause moderate damage to human infrastructure, especially to older buildings.

The Northeast Pacific tropical cyclone basin is defined as the region of the Pacific Ocean north of the equator and east of the International Date Line. The Northeast Pacific is further divided into two sub-basins, namely the east and central Pacific. The east Pacific runs east of the 140th meridian west, and tropical cyclones occurring there are warned upon by the National Hurricane Center, the current Regional Specialized Meteorological Center (RSMC) for that area. The central Pacific, running from the 140th meridian west to the International Date Line, currently has the Central Pacific Hurricane Center as its RSMC. Tropical cyclones are generally much rarer in the central Pacific than in the east Pacific, with an average of just four to five storms forming or moving into the central Pacific compared to around 15 for the east Pacific. All tropical cyclones recorded by past and present RSMCs of the Northeast Pacific basin since 1949 are listed in the Northeast and North Central Pacific hurricane database (HURDAT), which is compiled and maintained by the National Hurricane Center.

Exceptions to these rules would be storms that affected humans and as such humans were able to measure or estimate wind speeds or pressure data.

Climatology

In the east Pacific and central Pacific sub-basins, hurricane season begins on May 15 and June 1, respectively, with both concluding on November 30. Since 1949, a total of 242 Category 1 hurricanes have developed in the Northeast Pacific basin. Only two have occurred in the off-season: Nina (1957) and Winnie (1983). In addition to those, seven systems have been at Category 1 intensity in May, 31 in June, 47 in July, 57 in August, 70 in September, 37 in October, and seven in November.

The majority of tropical cyclones form and organize in areas of warm sea surface temperatures, usually of at least  and low vertical wind shear; however, there are outliers to this general rule, such as storms that manage to intensify despite high amounts of vertical wind shear. When a pre-existing tropical disturbance – usually a tropical wave or a disturbance originating in the Intertropical Convergence Zone – enters an area where the aforementioned conditions are present, the disturbance can develop into a tropical cyclone, provided it is far enough from the equator to experience a sufficiently strong Coriolis force, which causes the counterclockwise rotation of hurricanes in the Northern Hemisphere. Between the months of December and April, sea surface temperatures in the tropics, where most Northeast Pacific tropical cyclones develop, are usually too low to support significant development. Also, the presence of a semi-permanent high-pressure area known as the North Pacific High in the eastern Pacific greatly reduces tropical cyclone development in the winter months, as the North Pacific High results in vertical wind shear that causes environmental conditions to be unconducive to tropical cyclone formation. Another factor preventing tropical cyclones from forming during the winter is the presence of a semi-permanent low-pressure area called the Aleutian Low between January and April. Its effects in the central Pacific near the 160th meridian west cause tropical waves that form in the area to move northward into the Gulf of Alaska. As the disturbances travel northward, they dissipate or transition into an extratropical cyclone. The Aleutian Low's retreat in late April allows the warmth of the Pacific High to meander in, bringing its powerful clockwise wind circulation with it. During the month of May, the Intertropical Convergence Zone migrates southward while vertical shear over the tropics decrease. As a result, the earliest tropical waves begin to form, coinciding with the start of the eastern Pacific hurricane season on May 15. During summer and early fall, sea surface temperatures rise further, reaching  in July and August, well above the  threshold for the formation and intensification of tropical cyclones. This allows for tropical cyclones developing during that time to strengthen significantly, perhaps even rapidly.

The El Niño-Southern Oscillation also influences the frequency and intensity of hurricanes in the Northeast Pacific basin. During El Niño events, sea surface temperatures increase in the Northeast Pacific and vertical wind shear decreases. Because of this, an increase in tropical cyclone activity occurs; the opposite happens in the Atlantic basin during El Niño, where increased wind shear creates an unfavorable environment for tropical cyclone formation. Contrary to El Niño, La Niña events increase wind shear and decreases sea surface temperatures over the eastern Pacific, while reducing wind shear and increasing sea surface temperatures over the Atlantic.

Within the Northeast Pacific, the easterly trade winds cause tropical cyclones to generally move westward out into the open Pacific Ocean. Only rarely do tropical cyclones forming during the peak months of the season make landfall. Closer to the end of the season, the subtropical ridge steers some storms northwards or northeastwards. Storms influenced by this ridge may bring impacts to the western coasts of Mexico and occasionally even Central America. In the central Pacific basin, the North Pacific High keeps tropical cyclones away from the Hawaiian Islands by forcing them southwards. Combined with cooler waters around the Hawaiian Islands that tend to weaken tropical cyclones that approach them, this makes direct impacts on the Hawaiian Islands by tropical cyclones rare.

Systems
Key
 Discontinuous duration (weakened below Category 1 then restrengthened to that classification at least once)
 Intensified past Category 1 intensity after exiting basin

Landfalls

Out of the 237 Category 1 hurricanes in the east and central Pacific, 47 have made landfall as a tropical cyclone, collectively resulting in 63 landfalls. As tropical cyclones tend to weaken before landfall due to the effects of land interaction, only 34 Category 1 hurricanes actually made landfall while still at Category 1 strength. Fourteen storms made two landfalls and one made three. Multiple Category 1 hurricanes made landfall only in 10 years; there were no more than two landfalling storms in a single year.

See also

 List of Pacific hurricanes
 List of Pacific hurricane seasons
 List of Category 1 Atlantic hurricanes
 List of Category 1 Australian region tropical cyclones
 List of Category 1 South Pacific tropical cyclones

Notes

References

List
Category 1
Pacific 1